Büklüce is a village in the District of Manavgat, Antalya Province, Turkey. As of 2000 it had a population of 262 people.

References

Villages in Manavgat District